Events in the year 1953 in Germany.

Incumbents
President – Theodor Heuss 
Chancellor – Konrad Adenauer

Events 
 12 March - 1953 Avro Lincoln shootdown incident
 12 April - Football team Dynamo Dresden was founded.
 10 May - The town of Chemnitz, East Germany becomes Karl Marx Stadt.
 16/17 June - Uprising of 1953 in East Germany
 18 to 20 June - 3rd Berlin International Film Festival
 7 July - 1953 Menzengraben mining accident
 6 September - West German federal election, 1953
 20 October - The Second Adenauer cabinet led by Konrad Adenauer was sworn in.
 Date unknown - Ziegler–Natta catalyst invented by Karl Ziegler and Giulio Natta.

Births
 January 10 - Guido Kratschmer, German decathlete
 January 16 - Reinhard Jirgl, German writer
 January 22 - Jürgen Pommerenke, German football player
 January 24 - Ulrich Holbein, German writer
 January 31 - Gertrude Lübbe-Wolff, German judge
 March 1 - Rolf Danneberg, German discus thrower
 March 14 - Christian von Ditfurth, German historian
 March 24 - Mathias Richling, German comedian
 February 25 - Martin Kippenberger, German artist (died 1997)
 April 10 - Heiner Lauterbach, German actor
 May 11 - Thomas Middelhoff, German manager
 May 18 - Ute Kircheis-Wessel, German fencer
 June 20 - Ulrich Mühe, German actor (died 2007)
 June 23 - Michael Eichberger, German judge
 July 23 - Karl-Heinz Radschinsky, German weightlifter
 July 26 - Felix Magath, German footballer and football trainer
 July 30 - Heribert Prantl, German journalist
 August 17 - Andreas Kirchner, German Winter sportsman (died 2010)
 August 17 - Herta Müller, German writer
 August 27 - Gabriele Haefs, translator. 
 August 29 - Rainer Pottel, German decathlete
 September 2 - Gerhard Thiele, German astronaut
 September 21 - Reinhard Marx, German cardinal of the Catholic Church 
 November 7 - Ottfried Fischer, German actor
 November 16 - Brigitte Zypries, German politician
 October 1 - Klaus Wowereit, German politician
 October 10 - Martin Viessmann, German businessman
 October 15  - Günther Oettinger, German politician
 December 11 - Klaus Schmidt, German archaeologist (died 2014)
 December 23 - Rüdiger, Margrave of Meissen, German nobleman
 December 26 - Henning Schmitz, German musician
 December 29
 Thomas Bach, 9th president of the IOC
 Matthias Platzeck, German politician

Deaths

28 January - Theophil Wurm, German leader in the German Protestant Church in the early twentieth century (born 1868)
20 January - Ernest Augustus, Duke of Brunswick (born 1913)
24 February - Gerd von Rundstedt, German field marshal (born 1875)
28 March - Alfred Philippson, German geographer (born 1864)
 2 April - Hugo Sperrle, German field marshal of Luftwaffe (born 1885)
20 April - Erich Weinert, German writer (born 1890)
12 May - Fritz Mackensen, German painter (born 1866)
18 May - Rudolf Nadolny, German diplomat (born 1873)
21 May - Ernst Zermelo, German mathematician (born 1871)
31 July - Georg Zacharias, German swimmer (born 1884)
13 August - Paul Kemp, German actor (born 1896)
15 August - Ludwig Prandtl, German engineer (born 1875)
24 September — Hugo Schmeisser, German weapons designer (born 1884)
29 September- Ernst Reuter, German politician (born 1889)
27 October — Eduard Künneke, German composer (born 1885)

References

 
1950s in Germany
Years of the 20th century in Germany
Germany
Germany